10 Persei is a blue supergiant star in the constellation Perseus. Its apparent magnitude is 6.26 although it is slightly variable.

10 Persei is located around  distant in the Perseus OB1 stellar association.  It lies close to the Double Cluster and is considered a cluster member.

In 1999, 10 Persei was given the variable star designation V554 Persei, after being identified as varying in Hipparcos photometry.  Its brightness varies by less than a tenth of a magnitude with no clear period.

References

Further reading
 
 

Perseus (constellation)
Persei, 10
B-type supergiants
Persei, V554
Emission-line stars
011279
BD+55 0612
0696
014818
Alpha Cygni variables